This is a population history of the 272 active incorporated municipalities of the US State of Colorado since the 2000 United States census as estimated by the United States Census Bureau. 

With a 2021 population estimate of 711,463 residents, the City and County of Denver remains the most populous municipality in Colorado, while the Town of Carbonate still has no year-round residents. Colorado now has 13 municipalities with more than 100,000 residents, and 17 with fewer than 100 residents.

The following table will be expanded as additional censuses are taken.


Municipalities

See also

Colorado
Bibliography of Colorado
Index of Colorado-related articles
Outline of Colorado
Geography of Colorado
History of Colorado
List of counties in Colorado
List of places in Colorado
List of mountain passes in Colorado
List of mountain peaks of Colorado
List of mountain ranges of Colorado
List of populated places in Colorado
List of census-designated places in Colorado
List of county seats in Colorado
List of forts in Colorado
List of ghost towns in Colorado
List of historic places in Colorado
List of municipalities in Colorado
List of populated places in Colorado by county
List of post offices in Colorado
List of statistical areas in Colorado
List of rivers of Colorado
List of protected areas of Colorado
List of statistical areas in Colorado

Notes

References

External links

United States Department of Commerce
United States Census Bureau
State of Colorado
Department of Local Affairs
Colorado Municipal League
History Colorado

Lists of places in Colorado
Lists of populated places in Colorado
Local government in Colorado
Population history of Colorado municipalities
Colorado municipalities, Population history of
Colorado municipalities, Population history of